Anna Arkadyevna Smolina (born 1 September 1994) is a Russian tennis player.

Smolina has won four doubles titles on the ITF tour in her career. On 25 November 2013, she reached her best singles ranking of world number 725. On 29 October 2012, she peaked at world number 466 in the doubles rankings.

Smolina made her WTA tour debut at the 2012 Baku Cup partnering Caroline Garcia in doubles, where she lost in the quarterfinals to top seeds Nina Bratchikova and Alexandra Panova.

ITF finals (4–4)

Doubles (4–4)

References

External links 

 
 

1994 births
Living people
Sportspeople from Kazan
Russian female tennis players
21st-century Russian women
20th-century Russian women